Ryors is an extinct town in Osage County, in the U.S. state of Missouri. The GNIS classifies it as a populated place.

A post office called Ryors was established in 1905, and remained in operation until 1934. The community has the name of R.S. Ryors, a local attorney.

References

Ghost towns in Missouri
Former populated places in Osage County, Missouri